América Sánchez (born 1939) is an Argentinian graphic designer and photographer. Born in Buenos Aires, he moved to Barcelona in 1965.

Her work is included in the collections of the Museum of Fine Arts Houston and the Museum of Modern Art, New York.

Selected exhibitions
1980 "Iconografía moderna", fotomontajes de America Sanchez, MACBA, Barcelona
2016 America Sanchez. Romanesque portraits. Ink on paper, Museu Nacional d'Art de Catalunya

References

Living people
1939 births
20th-century Argentine artists